Upfield is a word with several meanings:
 Upfield (company), a margarine and food spreads company, derived from margarine division of Unilever
 Upfield, Victoria, a suburb of Melbourne, Australia
Upfield railway station
Upfield railway line
Upfield bike path
 Arthur Upfield (1890–1964), a detective novelist